Sheykh Mohammad (also Romanized as Sheykh Moḩammad; also known as Bar Āftāb and Bar Āftāb Sheykh Mohammad) is a village in Javid-e Mahuri Rural District, in the Central District of Mamasani County, Fars Province, Iran. At the 2006 census, its population was 40, in 12 families.

References 

Populated places in Mamasani County